Oswald Smith Crocket (April 13, 1868 – March 2, 1945) was a Canadian lawyer, politician, and Puisne Justice of the Supreme Court of Canada.

Born in Chatham, New Brunswick, the son of William Crocket and Marion Caldwell, he received a Bachelor of Arts in 1886 from the University of New Brunswick. He was called to the Bar in 1892 and practised law.

In 1904, he was elected to the House of Commons of Canada in the riding of York, New Brunswick as a Conservative. He was re-elected in 1908 and 1911. In 1913, he was appointed the Court of King's Bench Division of the Supreme Court of New Brunswick. In 1932, he was appointed to the Supreme Court of Canada and served until he retired in 1943.

He died in 1945, at home.

References

External links
 Supreme Court of Canada biography
 

Justices of the Supreme Court of Canada
Conservative Party of Canada (1867–1942) MPs
Members of the House of Commons of Canada from New Brunswick
Lawyers in New Brunswick
Journalists from New Brunswick
1868 births
1945 deaths